Dasymalla axillaris, commonly known as native foxglove or woolly foxglove, is a flowering plant in the mint family Lamiaceae and is endemic to Western Australia. It is a small, diffuse shrub with its branches, leaves and some of its flower parts densely covered with white, woolly hairs. The flowers are a shade of red and tube-shaped with the stamens and style extending beyond the end of the five petals.

Description

Each flower is surrounded by woolly bracts and bracteoles. The tube is sparsely hairy on the outside and mostly glabrous on the inside, except for a ring of hairs near the ovary. The stamens are longer than the flower tube and the style is longer than the stamens. Flowering occurs from July to December and is followed by an egg-shaped fruit with two humps on the end and the sepals attached to it.

Taxonomy and naming
Dasymalla axillaris was first formally described in 1839 by Stephan Endlicher and the description was published in his book Novarum Stirpium Decades. In 1917, George Druce transferred the species to Pityrodia but in 2011, Barry Conn, Murray Henwood and Nicola Streiber resurrected the genus Dasymalla, including this species. The specific epithet (axillaris) is a Latin word meaning "of an axil".

Distribution and habitat

Conservation
Dasymalla axillaris is classified as "critically endangered" under the Environment Protection and Biodiversity Conservation Act 1999 and as "Threatened Flora (Declared Rare Flora — Extant)" by the Department of Environment and Conservation (Western Australia) meaning that it is likely to become extinct or is rare, or otherwise in need of special protection. The main threats to its survival are road and rail maintenance activities.

References

axillaris
Plants described in 1839
Flora of Western Australia